"Makhna" is a hit single by Indian rapper Yo Yo Honey Singh and Neha Kakkar. The track was released on 21 December 2018 as a single by T-Series via YouTube. The video features Nidhi Sunil and Yo Yo Honey Singh. It was shot in Old Havana, Cuba and is one of the most expensive music videos of India.

Music video 
The musical video marks the comeback of the rapper after 4 years due to his Bipolar disorder. The video is produced by Bhushan Kumar of T-Series and co-produced by Bobby Suri and Yo Yo Honey Singh and is directed by Daniel Duran.

Reception 
The song has received commercial success, peaking at the number one position on YouTube India views, crossing 20 million views within 24 hours of its release, It is currently the most commented Indian music video song on YouTube. As of June 2022, it has over 330 million views on YouTube with over 4 million likes.

References

External links 
 
 Makhna on Hungama.com
 Makhna on iTunes

2018 songs
2018 singles
Hindi songs
Indian songs
Yo Yo Honey Singh songs
Neha Kakkar songs
T-Series (company) singles